Picoas station is part of the Yellow Line of the Lisbon Metro, located on the north side of the city centre on Avenida Fontes Pereira de Melo.

History
Picoas is one of the 11 stations that belong to the original Lisbon Metro network, opened on December 29, 1959.

The architectural design of the original station is by Falcão e Cunha. On November 9, 1982, the station was extended, based on the architectural design of Benoliel de Carvalho. On April 3, 1995, the station was refurbished, based on the architectural design of Dinis Gomes.

Connections

Urban buses

Carris 
 207 Cais do Sodré ⇄ Fetais
 727 Estação Roma-Areeiro ⇄ Restelo - Av. das Descobertas 
 736 Cais do Sodré ⇄ Odivelas (Bairro Dr. Lima Pimentel)
 738 Quinta dos Barros ⇄ Alto de Santo Amaro
 744 Marquês de Pombal ⇄ Moscavide (Quinta das Laranjeiras)
 783 Amoreiras (Centro Comercial) ⇄ Portela - Rua Mouzinho de Albuquerque

Aerobus 
 Linha 2 Aeroporto ⇄ Sete Rios

See also
 List of Lisbon metro stations

References

External links

Yellow Line (Lisbon Metro) stations
Railway stations opened in 1959